Bottoms Up is an album by jazz saxophonist Illinois Jacquet which was recorded in 1968 and released on the Prestige label.

Reception

Scott Yanow of Allmusic stated, "Even in 1968 when the jazz avant-garde was becoming quite influential, tenor saxophonist Illinois Jacquet played in his own timeless style, performing in an idiom little changed during the previous 20 years".

Track listing 
All compositions by Illinois Jacquet except where noted.
 "Bottoms Up" – 3:21     
 "Port of Rico" – 4:12     
 "You Left Me All Alone" – 3:51     
 "Sassy" (Milt Buckner) – 5:41     
 "Jivin' with Jack the Bellboy" (Bill Doggett, Illinois Jacquet) – 5:40     
 "I Don't Stand a Ghost of a Chance with You" (Bing Crosby, Ned Washington, Victor Young) – 6:12     
 "Our Delight" (Tadd Dameron) – 5:28     
 "Don't Blame Me" (Dorothy Fields, Jimmy McHugh) – 4:09

Personnel 
Illinois Jacquet – tenor saxophone
Barry Harris – piano
Ben Tucker – bass
Alan Dawson – drums

References 

1968 albums
Illinois Jacquet albums
Prestige Records albums
Albums produced by Don Schlitten